General MacArthur Square is a , V-shaped park in Cambridge, Massachusetts, United States, owned by the city. The city's first 24-hour, freestanding public toilet was installed in the park in 2015.

The Crimson Norah Murphy described the park as "a glorified traffic island", featuring a statue of Charles Sumner by Anne Whitney.

References

Squares in Cambridge, Massachusetts